This was the first edition of the tournament.

Denis Istomin won the title after defeating Reilly Opelka 6–4, 6–2 in the final.

Seeds

Draw

Finals

Top half

Bottom half

External Links
Main Draw
Qualifying Draw

Oracle Challenger Series - Chicago - Men's Singles
2018 Men's Singles